The Qualified Foreign Institutional Investor program, one of the first efforts to internationalize the RMB, represents China's effort to allow, on a selective basis, global institutional investors to invest in its RMB denominated capital market.   Once licensed, foreign investors are permitted to buy RMB-denominated "A shares" in China's mainland Shanghai and Shenzhen stock exchanges.  Thus foreign investors benefit from an opportunity to invest onshore, which is otherwise often insulated from the rest of the world, and subject to capital controls governing the movement of assets in-and-out of the country.

Development
The program has been in operation for over a decade, and quotas allocating RMB under licenses have expanded steadily.  By the end of April 2011, 103 licensed QFII investors had been granted a combined quota of $20.7 billion to invest in China's capital markets under the QFII program, UBS AG currently holds the greatest single share of quota. Foreign access to China's yuan-denominated "A" stocks are still limited, with quotas placed under the QFII program amounting to US$30 billion.

In April, 2012, the Qualified Foreign investment quota was increased from US$30 billion to US$80 billion. Before the increase, the overall value of approved QFII and RQFII (offshore Renminbi QFII) funds was only 0.8% of total market capitalization and only US$25 billion of the US$30 billion quota was used. While aspects of the increased quota seem likely to take business from Hong Kong, a pilot program in Wenzhou for domestic investors to invest abroad was considered a possible offset for the financial center. The QFII expansion was also followed quickly by the "approval of new ETF products that will be denominated in offshore yuan (CNH) but will trade on the Hong Kong Stock Exchange".

China granted $910 million worth of investment quotas to 11 foreign institutional investors in March 2013.
The quotas, under the Qualified Foreign Institutional Investor (QFII) scheme, were awarded to overseas institutions including Generali Fund Management S.A, IDG Capital Management (HK) Ltd and Cutwater Investor Services Corp. By the end of March 2013, China had awarded a combined $41.745 billion of QFII quotas to 197 foreign institutions.

By the end of February 2014,   the total quotas issued under the QFII programme to $52.3 billion as of Feb. 28 from $51.4 billion at the end of December, and to 180.4 billion yuan ($29.44 billion) from 167.8 billion yuan under the RQFII programme, according to data by the Chinese agency, SAFE

China's QFII programme quotas stood at $111.38 billion by August, 2019, according to data by the foreign exchange regulator.

In September, 2019,  China's State Administration of Foreign Exchange (SAFE) published a statement, it would remove quotas on the QFII scheme and RQFII.

At the end of September 2020, published by The China Securities Regulatory Commission (CSRC), the central bank(PBOC) and the foreign exchange regulator(SAFE), combine the QFII scheme and RQFII. In addition, foreign institutions will also have access to derivatives, including financial futures, commodity futures and options.

Background 
Regulations of the QFII program were based on "Temporary Regulation on  Domestic Securities Investment by Qualified Foreign Institutional Investor" (合格境外机构投资者境内证券投资管理暂行办法), which was publicized on 5th Nov 2002 and ceased to be in effect on 1st Sep 2006, and  "Regulation on  Domestic Securities Investment by Qualified Foreign Institutional Investor"(合格境外机构投资者境内证券投资管理办法), which is publicized on 24th Aug 2006, and came into effect on 1st Sep 2006.

Pursuant to "Regulation on Domestic Securities Investment by Qualified Foreign Institutional Investor", to qualify as a QFII, the candidate must:
    
have stable finance, good credibility, meet the minimum asset scale set by China Securities Regulatory Commission (CSRC);
the number of staffs meet the requirement set by the authority in its own country or area;
has healthy governing structure and complete internal control system, received no significant punishment in the last 3 years;
candidate's home country has complete legal and supervision system, and its home country or home area has signed Memorandum of Understanding(MOU) with CSRC, and maintains effective supervision cooperation;
other requirements set by CSRC based on prudence.

QFII Custodian Bank

QFII Qualification Statistics 
As of December 2021, a total of 670 institutions outside mainland China have obtained QFII qualifications. The following is a list of approved institutions.

See also
Qualified Domestic Institutional Investor (QDII)
State Administration of Foreign Exchange (SAFE)
Economy of China
Chinese financial system
Banking in China

References

External links
 China Securities Regulatory Commission (中国证券监督管理委员会) website 

Institutional investors
Investment in China